Disk-winged bats are a small group of bats of the family Thyropteridae and genus Thyroptera. They are found in Central and South America, usually in moist tropical rain forests. It is a very small family, consisting of a single genus with five extant and one fossil species.

The name comes from the suction cups found at the base of the thumb and under the heel of these animals, similar to those found in sucker-footed bats. These structures help them to cling smooth surfaces, and to remain, for example, inside young coiled banana, Heliconia, and prayer plant leaves, where they roost.

They can also be recognized by their reduced thumbs, which are enclosed by the wing membranes, and their funnel-shaped ears. They have brownish to black fur, and roost in small groups, or singly. They are insectivorous and can live in many different kinds of environments.

Taxonomy 
Family Tyropteridae
 Genus Thyroptera
 De Vivo's disk-winged bat, Thyroptera devivoi
 Peters's disk-winged bat, Thyroptera discifera
 LaVal's disk-winged bat, Thyroptera lavali
 Spix's disk-winged bat, Thyroptera tricolor
 Patricia's disk-winged bat, Thyroptera wynneae
 †Thyroptera robusta, Middle Miocene (Laventan) Honda Group, Colombia

References 

 
Bat genera
Taxa named by Johann Baptist von Spix